In Sorte Diaboli (Latin for "In league with the devil") is the eighth studio album by Norwegian symphonic black metal band Dimmu Borgir, released in 2007. It is the band's first concept album. A site on the Nuclear Blast website was created for In Sorte Diaboli, in which a new promotional photo can be seen and an audio sample can be heard. This would be the last album by Dimmu Borgir to feature ICS Vortex, Hellhammer and Mustis.

Concept
In Sorte Diaboli is the band's first concept album, with a story located in medieval Europe. It is about a priest who begins to doubt his faith, and then ends up taking the place of the Antichrist. "There's this dude that works as a priest's assistant, and after a while he just discovers that he has nothing to do with Christianity", Silenoz says. "He just sort of has this awakening and realizes that he has different abilities and different powers and is leaning more to the dark side." The words "In Sorte Diaboli" are a repeated line in the song "The Chosen Legacy" and the words also appears towards the end of the song, "The Sinister Awakening". The conclusion of the story in the booklet implies that the story of In Sorte Diaboli is not yet finished. This remains to be seen, as their next album, Abrahadabra, is heavily influenced by Aleister Crowley's Thelema text The Book of the Law. IGN named the album the Top Metal Album of 2007.

Critical reception
In Sorte Diaboli received generally positive critical reception. Allmusic gave the album 3 stars and praised the music, saying "[T]here's really great stuff here in the music, the production, in the sound effects". However they criticised the concept and lyrics of the album, writing "Too bad it all melts down when it comes to the concept, which is ho hum at best". About.com was more positive and gave the album 4 stars and wrote that "[T]he songs are orchestral and melodic, but still plenty of punch and darkness". Both Blabbermouth and Metal Hammer gave the album 9/10, and Kerrang! gave it 4/5.

The album cover was rated by LA Weekly 9 out of 25 from their article The 25 Creepiest Heavy Metal Album Covers.

Chart and sales performance
In their native Norway, the album peaked at number 1, which marks the first time in history of a black metal band reaching the number 1 spot. The album sold approximately 14,000 copies in its first week. The album also sold well in Sweden, Finland, Austria and Switzerland.

Track listing
All songs written by Shagrath, Silenoz and Galder. All lyrics written by Silenoz.

Personnel
 Dimmu Borgir
 Shagrath – lead vocals
 Silenoz – rhythm guitar, liner story
 Galder –  lead guitar
 Mustis – synthesizers
 I.C.S. Vortex – bass, clean vocals on tracks 1, 4 & 10
 Hellhammer – drums

 Technical
 Fredrik Nordström - Mixing, engineering
 Patrik J. Sten - assistant engineering
 Joachim Luetke - cover concept and artwork
 Patric Ullaeus - photography

Special editions

 The album was specially released in a limited edition digipak that contains a bonus DVD, 32-page booklet, and mirrored lyrics. The European limited digipak and the mail order leather-bound book editions come with a plastic mirror with which one can properly read the lyrics. The North American limited edition does not contain this mirror. The DVD contains the video clip for "The Serpentine Offering", two short "making of" documentaries for both the album and the video, a photogallery, and a media player.
 The limited-edition European digipak features the bonus track "The Ancestral Fever" as the fourth track.
 The limited-edition North American digipak features the bonus track "The Heretic Hammer" as the sixth track.
 The limited-edition Japanese digipak features the bonus track "Black Metal", a cover of the classic Venom track, as the tenth track.
 A very limited exclusive mail order edition, which features a leather booklet, was also released. This version also contains the two bonus tracks from the North American and European digipak versions.
 The vinyl edition is a gatefold LP packaged with a bonus 7", which also contains both the European and the North American Bonus track, and is limited to 2000 copies worldwide.
 The artwork is censored by a slipcase cover in North America.

References

External links
Official In Sorte Diaboli page at NuclearBlast.com

Dimmu Borgir albums
2007 albums
Nuclear Blast albums
Concept albums
Albums recorded at Studio Fredman
Albums produced by Fredrik Nordström